Taimullah (Arabic: تيم الله, ‘Tayyim-u Allāh) sometimes spelled as Taymullah, is a Muslim and Arabic male given name which means "the person who loves God”.

It may refer to:

Patronyms 

 Taimullah, a pre-Islamic tribal branch from Banu Bakr, descendants of Taimullah b. thaʿlabah b. ʿUkābah.

References 

Arabic masculine given names